The Ministry of Foreign Affairs, Cooperation and Communities is a ministry of the Government of São Tomé and Príncipe. The current Minister is Edite Tenjua, appointed in 2020.

List of ministers
This is a list of Ministers of Foreign Affairs, Cooperation and Communities of São Tomé and Príncipe:

1975............ Miguel Trovoada
1975–1978: Leonel Mário d'Alva
1978–1985: Maria do Nascimento da Graça Amorim
1985–1986: Manuel Pinto da Costa
1986–1987: Fradique de Menezes
1987–1988: Guilherme Posser da Costa
1988–1990: Carlos Graça
1990–1991: Guilherme Posser da Costa
1991–1993: Alda Bandeira
1993–1994: Albertino Bragança
1994............ Alberto Ferreira Chong
1994–1996: Guilherme Posser da Costa
1996–1999: Homero Jeronimo Salvaterra
1999............ Alberto Paulino
1999–2000: Paulo Jorge Espirito Santo
2000–2001: Joaquim Rafael Branco
2001–2002: Patrice Trovoada
2002............ Mateus Meira Rita
2002............ Alda Bandeira
2002–2004: Mateus Meira Rita
2004............ Óscar Sousa
2004–2006: Ovídio Manuel Barbosa Pequeno
2006............ Óscar Sousa
2006–2007: Carlos Gustavo dos Anjos
2007–2008: Ovídio Manuel Barbosa Pequeno
2008–2010: Carlos Tiny
2010–2012: Manuel Salvador dos Ramos
2012–2014: Natália Pedro da Costa Umbelina Neto
2014–2016: Manuel Salvador dos Ramos
2016–2018: Urbino Botelho
2018–2019: Elsa Teixeira Pinto
2020–present: Edite Tenjua

See also
 São Tomé and Príncipe
 List of presidents of São Tomé and Príncipe
 List of prime ministers of São Tomé and Príncipe
 List of presidents of the Regional Government of Príncipe
 List of governors of Portuguese São Tomé and Príncipe
 Lists of office-holders
 List of current heads of state and government

References

External links
 

São Tomé and Príncipe
Foreign affairs